Sir Alexander Allan, 1st Baronet (c. 1764 – 14 September 1820) was a British painter and politician.

He joined the East India Company as a cadet in 1779 and had been promoted to captain when he served in the Fourth Mysore War in 1798 as Deputy Quartermaster-General. He painted numerous water colours of the campaign.

On his return to England he was elected Member of Parliament (MP) for Berwick-upon-Tweed from 1803 to 1806 and 1807 to 1820. He was a director of the East India Company from 1814 to 1817 and 1819 to his death.

He was made a baronet on 18 September 1819, of Kingsgate in the County of Kent. The title became extinct upon his death in 1820. He never married.

References

1760s births
1820 deaths
18th-century British painters
British male painters
Members of the Parliament of the United Kingdom for English constituencies
UK MPs 1802–1806
UK MPs 1807–1812
UK MPs 1812–1818
UK MPs 1818–1820
Baronets in the Baronetage of the United Kingdom
Directors of the British East India Company